The Lake of Sainte-Croix is a man-made lake that was formed by the construction, between 1971 and 1974 (when it was put into service) of a reinforced-concrete arch dam by the name of .  It is fed by the Verdon river, at the outlet of the Verdon Gorge. The reservoir holds a maximum of 761 million cubic metres of water.  The dam, which generates 142 million kWh of electricity per year, is 94 metres high, 7.5 metres thick at its base and 3 metres thick at its crest.

The village Les Salles-sur-Verdon stands by the lake; it was rebuilt on the shore after the original village was destroyed to make room for the reservoir. Other villages around the lake are Sainte-Croix-du-Verdon and Bauduen.

External links
 

Sainte Croix
Landforms of Var (department)
Landforms of Alpes-de-Haute-Provence